Ayrton Sweeney (born 11 May 1993) is a South African pool swimmer and artistic swimmer. He competed in the men's 200 metre individual medley event at the 2017 World Aquatics Championships. In 2019, he represented South Africa at the 2019 African Games held in Rabat, Morocco.
 
At the 2022 World Aquatics Championships, he and his partner Laura Strugnell compete at FINA World Aquatics Championships, placing 13th in the preliminary round of the mixed duet free routine.

References

1993 births
Living people
South African male swimmers
Place of birth missing (living people)
African Games medalists in swimming
African Games silver medalists for South Africa
Male medley swimmers
Swimmers at the 2015 African Games
Swimmers at the 2019 African Games
South African synchronised swimmers